Jena – Sömmerda – Weimarer Land I is an electoral constituency (German: Wahlkreis) represented in the Bundestag. It elects one member via first-past-the-post voting. Under the current constituency numbering system, it is designated as constituency 191. It is located in north-central Thuringia, comprising the city of Jena, the Sömmerda district, and most of the Weimarer Land district.

Jena – Sömmerda – Weimarer Land I was created for the inaugural 1990 federal election after German reunification. Since 2021, it has been represented by Holger Becker of the Social Democratic Party (SPD).

Geography
Jena – Sömmerda – Weimarer Land I is located in north-central Thuringia. As of the 2021 federal election, it comprises the independent city of Jena, the Sömmerda district, and the entirety of the Weimarer Land excluding the municipality of Grammetal.

History
Jena – Sömmerda – Weimarer Land I was created after German reunification in 1990, then known as Sömmerda – Artern – Sondershausen – Langensalza. In the 2002 election, it was named Kyffhäuserkreis – Sömmerda – Unstrut-Hainich-Kreis II. In the 2005 through 2013 elections, it was named Kyffhäuserkreis – Sömmerda – Weimarer Land I. It acquired its current name in the 2017 election. In the 1990 through 1998 elections, it was constituency 298 in the numbering system. In the 2002 and 2005 elections, it was number 192. Since the 2009 election, it has been number 191.

Originally, the constituency comprised the districts of Sömmerda, Artern, Sondershausen, and Langensalza. In the 2002 election, it comprised the districts of Sömmerda and Kyffhäuserkreis as well as the municipalities of Mühlhausen, Anrode, Dünwald, Herbsleben, Menteroda, Weinbergen, and Unstruttal and the Verwaltungsgemeinschaften of Bad Tennstedt, Hildebrandshausen/Lengenfeld unterm Stein, and Schlotheim from the Unstrut-Hainich-Kreis district. In the 2005 through 2013 elections, it comprised districts of Sömmerda, Kyffhäuserkreis, and Weimarer Land excluding the municipality of Grammetal. It acquired its current borders in the 2017 election.

Members
The constituency was first represented by Martin Göttsching of the Christian Democratic Union (CDU) from 1990 to 1994, followed by fellow CDU member Johannes Selle from 1994 to 1998. Gisela Hilbrecht won it for the Social Democratic Party (SPD) in 1998 and served until 2005, when Peter Albach regained it for the CDU. Former member Selle of the CDU was elected again in 2009, and re-elected in 2013 and 2017. Holger Becker of the SPD won the constituency in 2021.

Election results

2021 election

2017 election

2013 election

2009 election

References

Federal electoral districts in Thuringia
1990 establishments in Germany
Constituencies established in 1990
Jena
Sömmerda (district)
Weimarer Land